Robert de Juilly or Robert de Juliac (died 27 July 1377) was the Grand Master of the Knights Hospitaller from 1374 to his death. He was succeeded by the famous Juan Fernández de Heredia.

References
Setton, Kenneth M. (general editor) A History of the Crusades: Volume III – The Fourteenth and Fifteenth Centuries. Harry W. Hazard, editor. University of Wisconsin Press: Madison, 1975.

1377 deaths
Christians of the Crusades
Grand Masters of the Knights Hospitaller
14th-century French people
Year of birth unknown